Irvin A. Kiffin Jr. (born August 8, 1951) is a retired American basketball player. Born in New York City, he played collegiately for Oklahoma Baptist University and Virginia Union University.

A 6'9" and 225 lb forward, Kiffin played for the San Antonio Spurs in the National Basketball Association (NBA) for 26 games in the 1979-80 season.

He was a member of the U.S. national team at the 1978 FIBA World Championship.

References

1951 births
Living people
American expatriate basketball people in France
American expatriate basketball people in Italy
American men's basketball players
Basketball players from New York City
Limoges CSP players
Oklahoma Baptist Bison basketball players
Power forwards (basketball)
San Antonio Spurs players
Small forwards
Undrafted National Basketball Association players
United States men's national basketball team players
Virginia Union Panthers men's basketball players
1978 FIBA World Championship players